Kreativum is a science center located at Karlshamn, at the southern part of Sweden.

External links
 Kreativum's Portal

Science and technology in Sweden